Jordan Whiston (born September 24, 1992), better known by his stage name Jay Whiss, is a Canadian rapper and songwriter from Toronto, Ontario. He first gained international attention after the release of the single "Watch This", which appeared on OVO Sound Radio in late 2015. Whiss also appeared on the Noisey documentary 6IX RISING (2017), which showcased hip hop culture in Canada. He is one-third of the hip hop collective Prime Boys, alongside Jimmy Prime and Donnie. Prime Boys released their debut studio album Koba World on July 27, 2018; the album received a 9/10 score by Exclaim!. Whiss was also featured in the short film Remember Me, Toronto (2019) by Mustafa the Poet.

He embarked on his solo venture in 2019 with the release of his EP Dark Clouds, after being signed to Universal Music Canada. The 3-track EP, which served as a prequel to his upcoming album, contained the single "Every Night", featuring vocals from Jimmy Prime and Safe, and "Dark Cloud", which was also confirmed to be the first single from the upcoming album. Jay's debut studio album Peace of Mind was released on March 3, 2020. The album was supported by the singles "Valet", featuring Puffy L'z, "Lay Low", featuring Donnie, and "Mind in a Maze". It received an 8/10 rating by Exclaim!.

Life and career

Early life: 1992–2010
Jay Whiss was born in 1992 to an Irish mother and Vincentian father. An only child, he was raised by his single mother who moved to St. Lawrence, Toronto when he was a week old. He has stated that he lived in a number of different places whilst growing up. Whiss claims he had a typical childhood, playing hockey and soccer, and in 2006, at the age of 11, he moved to the opposite side of the city but still hung around in The Esplanade area of Toronto. He attended numerous high schools but eventually dropped out after being 4.5 credits short of graduating. Whiss mentions that he had no musical influence in his family, but his mother, who was a part-time employee at HMV, used to bring numerous musical CDs from different genres home, which drew him to like music. He recalls his father saying to him: "you know the lyrics to every song but don't do your homework" in regards to his childhood. His earliest musical influences include Ludacris, Missy Elliot, The Notorious B.I.G., and Jay Z. He has also noted Canadian artists Solitair, Kardinal Offishall, and Point Blank amongst his influences.

Career beginnings: 2011–2015

Whiss decided to start rapping in the summer of 2010 at the age of 17, as a way to express himself. He released his first single "Chasing a Dream" on January 3, 2011, at the age of 18 via WorldStarHipHop, followed by the single "2011 Til Infinity" on February 6 of the same year. Both singles were shot with long-time Prime Boys affiliate and music video director Tristan Prime but received little recognition.
Alongside Prime Boys, Whiss and his entourage first attracted local attention in St. Lawrence in 2013 and gained national attraction with the single "I Heard", produced by Eric Dingus and released on November 17, 2014. Prime Boys' most prominent member at this time, Jimmy Prime, gained the group considerable attention for coining the nickname "The Six" for Toronto, a term that has been broadly accepted by rappers such as Drake. Jimmy Prime released his mixtape Block Boy in July 2015, featuring Whiss on the track "Best One". The release also prompted a photoshoot by Vice in the following month, which gained the group some notice on a national scale. Jay Whiss came to the attention of record label manager Oliver El-Khatib, who added Whiss' single "Imagine Us" to Episode 5 of OVO Sound Radio in September 2015. In November 2015, Whiss released the single "Watch This", produced by Lani Christ, and followed it up with a music video directed by Tristan Prime. The video featured cameos from his crew members Jimmy Prime, Donnie, and Esplanade associate Safe. He then went on to release the track "Need it all", which featured Jimmy Prime and was produced by Eric Dingus. Dingus was later signed by Drake, and added the song to Episode 42 Of OVO Sound Radio.

Koba World: 2016–2018
In early 2016, Halal Gang member and Esplanade native Safe drew the attention of Drake. Since gaining the approval stamp from Drake himself already in the previous year, Whiss remained relatively quiet in terms of making music. However, a few months later, Whiss released the single "Driven", which featured Safe and was produced by 1mind. The song "Full Circle", with Donnie, Puffy L'z, Smoke Dawg, Safe, and Jimmy Prime, showcased a new supergroup forming in Toronto with all 3 Prime Boys and 3 of the Halal Gang members. The song was released in September 2016 and quickly went viral, amassing over a million views in a year. The group were labelled the "all-star team" of Toronto street rap. The song was another of Whiss's that made it on OVO Sound Radio, this time on Episode 34. Whiss and the Prime Boys also became good friends with Toronto producer Murda Beatz in 2016, and the latter provided production for the artists' work. Murda Beatz released his mixtape Keep God First on December 10, 2016, featuring Jay Whiss on the track "Brown Money".

Jay Whiss officially made his debut feature on Spotify's Northern Bars playlist with the single "Welcome to the Life", which was released in May 2017 and produced by Murda Beatz. The Northern Bars Playlist is part of the RapCaviar series, which focuses on Canadian Hip Hop. Toronto's uTOpia music festival was held in June 2017 and showcase a new generation of artists in the General Toronto Area. Jimmy Prime, who was one of the main performers at the festival, brought out Jay Whiss and Donnie, who performed alongside Smoke Dawg, Puffy L'z, and Mo-G. The event was rated 7 by Exclaim!, who described Prime Boys and Halal Gang's performances as playing off of each other's energy. Whiss also appeared in the Noisey documentary 6IX RISING, which looks into the rising hip-hop scene of Toronto after the blockbuster success of Drake and The Weeknd. The film premiered to a limited audience at Hot Docs Ted Rogers Cinema on November 16, 2017.

In January 2018, Whiss announced that he and the Prime Boys were working on their debut collaboration album, due to be released sometime in the summer of 2018, initially titled Prime Forever. The following month, the group released the single "Tinted", produced by Murda Beatz, marking it as the lead single of the upcoming album. The music video for the single was directed by Elliot Clancy Osberg and saw the group ride ATVs in the tundra on a frozen lake. The song went on to feature on Northern Bars as well as giving Prime Boys the chance to further their careers and promote Canada's expanding hip-hop market. Clash conducted an interview on the Toronto Music Scene and published an article which portrays Toronto's rap underground on March 12, 2018. In the interview, Whiss described Toronto as a city that isn't a mystery anymore  and said that he wants his music to transcend everywhere. Full Circle affiliate Smoke Dawg and Prime Boys assistant manager Koba Prime were reportedly shot and killed on June 30, 2018, in an incident involving multiple victims. The death of Koba Prime influenced the name change of Prime Boys' upcoming album to Koba World as a tribute. Whiss went on to say that "names never die, and their names always live on" in regards to the album name change. The album was officially released on July 27, 2018, and was supported by the singles "Hold Me Down" and "Sopranos". Jay Whiss also participated in distributing exclusive Prime Boys merchandise on August 10  2018 in a pop-up shop near St. Lawrence Market. Smoke Dawg's posthumous album Struggle Before Glory was released on November 29, 2018. Jay Whiss made an appearance on the song "These Games", alongside Safe. The song was noted for glimpsing into a lighthearted future over a bouncy dance beat.

Peace of Mind: 2019–present
Jay Whiss was one of the artists who made the list of XXL's Top 15 Toronto rappers of 2019. In January 2019, he signed a deal with Universal Music Canada. Mustafa the Poet released the short film Remember Me, Toronto on March 17, 2018. The short film came about after the death of Smoke Dawg and tackles the subject of gun violence in Toronto. It features numerous Toronto rappers, including Jay Whiss, discussing how they want to be remembered after they die. Jay Whiss released his first work under Universal, the EP Dark Cloud, on June 5, 2019. The EP was also featured on Spotify's Northern Sound playlist. It contains the songs "How It Goes" and "Every Night", with vocals from Jimmy Prime and Safe, as well as the eponymous lead single, "Dark Cloud". The EP is dedicated to Koba and Smoke Dawg, and serves as a prelude to his forthcoming debut album. Full Circle affiliate and Halal Gang member Puffy L'z released the album Take No L'z in August 2019. Jay Whiss made an appearance on the single "Boring", featuring Smoke Dawg. Whiss also made a vocal appearance on Prime Boys member and longtime friend Donnie's debut album, From the Beginning to the End, on the song "Huddle". The album was released on November 22, 2019. Jay made an appearance on 6ixBuzz's second release NorthernSound, which came out on December 13, 2019, on the track "The World is Yours", alongside Jimmy Prime and Safe.

Whiss was listed at number 10 in Complex's Top 20 Canadian Artists to Watch Out For in 2020. During the month of December 2019, Whiss announced that his debut album Peace of Mind is slated for a release in early 2020. The lead single off the album, "Valet", came out on December 3, 2020, and featured vocals from Puffy L'z. The track was produced by Murda Beatz. The album was also supported by another Murda Beatz-produced track, titled "Lay Low", featuring Donnie. It was released on February 6, 2020. The album came out on March 3, 2020, and featured a vocal appearance from Jimmy Prime on the song "Left Me For Dead". The album received an 8/10 rating by Kyle Mullin of Exclaim!, who outlined Whiss as an artist who balances such "hood hedonism with genuinely thoughtful bars that make for a well-rounded listen".

Artistry

Influences
Whiss has cited several hip hop artists as influencing his rapping style, including Ludacris, Missy Elliot, The Notorious B.I.G., and Jay Z, while also crediting various Canadian musicians, such as Solitair, Kardinal Offishall, and Point Blank.

Discography

Studio albums
 Peace of Mind (2020)

Collaboration albums
 Koba World (2018) (with Prime Boys)

Appearance on compilations
 "Brown Money" Keep God First (Murda Beatz, 2016)
 "World Is Yours" NorthernSound (6ixbuzz, 2019)

Filmography

References

External links

 
 

Living people
21st-century Canadian rappers
Black Canadian musicians
Canadian hip hop singers
Canadian male rappers
Canadian pop singers
Canadian rhythm and blues singers
Canadian songwriters
Rappers from Toronto
1992 births
Canadian people of Irish descent
Canadian people of Caribbean descent
People from Saint Vincent (Antilles)
Canadian people of Saint Vincent and the Grenadines descent
Universal Music Group artists
21st-century Canadian male musicians